Operation Assured Response was a non-combatant evacuation operation in Liberia carried out by United States armed forces in 1996. 
In April 1996, in response to skirmishes in Monrovia between supporters of Charles Talyor and Roosevelt Johnson then President of the United States Bill Clinton made an executive order for United States armed forces to evacuate United States citizens and citizens not of Liberia. Clinton explained his executive order in a letter sent April 11, 1996 to then Representatives House speaker Newt Gingrich.

References

Assured Response
1996 in Liberia
Non-combatant evacuation operations